A by-election was held for the New South Wales Legislative Assembly electorate of Liverpool Plains on 5 June 1876 because Hanley Bennett was insolvent.

Dates

Result

Hanley Bennett was insolvent.

See also
Electoral results for the district of Liverpool Plains
List of New South Wales state by-elections

Notes

References

1876 elections in Australia
New South Wales state by-elections
1870s in New South Wales